Lincoln Cemetery may refer to:

Lincoln Cemetery (Cook County), Illinois
 Lincoln Cemetery (Harrisburg, Pennsylvania)
Lincoln Cemetery (Montgomery, Alabama), final resting place of Rufus "Tee Tot" Payne, mentor to Hank Williams, Sr.